The Valea Satului is a right tributary of the river Geamărtălui in Romania. It flows into the Geamărtălui in Vulpeni.

References

Rivers of Romania
Rivers of Olt County
Rivers of Dolj County